Froot (stylised in all caps) is the third studio album by Welsh singer Marina Diamandis and her last under the stage name Marina and the Diamonds. It was originally scheduled to be released on 3 April 2015 by Neon Gold Records and Atlantic Records, although it was ultimately released on 13 March 2015 due to unauthorised Internet leaks. Written entirely by Diamandis, she collaborated with David Kosten for production.

Musically, Froot is primarily a pop and synth-pop record with elements of electronic music, Europop, indie pop, new wave, and rock. Music critics commended its cohesive production and further applauded Diamandis for her vocal delivery. A critical success, it appeared on several critics' year-end lists in 2015. The record debuted at number 10 on the UK Albums Chart with first-week sales of 10,411 copies. It also became her first top 10 album in the United States, debuting at number eight on the Billboard 200 chart after selling 46,000 units.

The "Froot of the Month" campaign saw six songs ("Froot", "Happy", "Immortal", "I'm a Ruin", "Forget" and "Gold") released on a monthly basis in anticipation of the record. Froot has been promoted through a series of festival performances during the spring and summer; Diamandis toured internationally with the accompanying Neon Nature Tour, with performances scheduled in North America, Europe and South America between October 2015 and March 2016.

Background and production

Diamandis announced that she was writing material for her third album in February 2013, although she confirmed in a Facebook Q&A session with her fans on 13 October 2014 that material for the album was written from July 2012 onwards.

In an interview with The Line of Best Fit, Diamandis speaks of the past record and the new one. She said that as soon as she finished the record and "Primadonna" came out, she already knew what she wanted to do with the third record. Electra Heart (2012) came with a list of production and writing credits, but for the new record she preferred the company of one producer as opposed to a rotating cast; on Froot, she could create "the whole thing". She felt that her confidence as a songwriter had improved by listening to her instincts and believing in her own abilities.

"Electra Heart was so incredible in that it really changed the way that I wrote, and I don't think I would've written this album if I hadn't been through that process. I would be observing people like Diplo and Dr. Luke, and I found after that was writing in a much more free way, whereas when I was writing on my own with a piano I was really just stuck to it and I became quite limited, like I'd reached a certain point. I think it was down to the fact that they were giving me instrumentals to write on, and I was like 'well I can make an instrumental...' so I started making these really shoddy ones at home and then found that completely and suddenly opened up my whole songwriting sphere in a really amazing way."

Further, she felt that there was a distance between the way she sounded in a recorded and live performance, so when she started writing the album and was looking for a producer, she explained to her A&R that she needed to be produced as a band.

Diamandis also stated that Froot was not entirely dark and that "it's almost celebrating being happy". The album is described as considerably "reflective" in comparison to her previous releases, and is said to be "centred around extremely different things; half of the album is about a relationship that I had to end". The singer declared the word "Fruit" was spelled as "Froot" because she liked the way it looked, especially since the "O"s could interlink.

"I just want to take a moment to thank you for being a part of the Froot journey. I've been looking at your photos and letters today and whilst I feel so sad to see this project come to an end I'm full of joy for the memories we all created together ... It is an absolute privilege to have a profession that allows me the opportunity to connect and communicate with like-minded people all over the world and I hope to continue to do so in many different ways."

In April 2016, Diamandis announced the end of the Froot era through Instagram and Twitter via a Twitter live-chat  and personal letter directed toward her fans. Diamandis stated, "I've achieved so many things that I've been trying to for many years. Now, I'm gonna take a little break to do some different things. I've been on the road for seven years, and I've had an amazing, amazing experience. This isn't goodbye for good, it's just for a short while."

Composition
Froot is a pop and synth-pop album with elements of electronic music, Europop, indie pop, new wave, and rock.
The songs were recorded with a live band. The album opener, "Happy" was described by Idolator as being a "dreary, heartfelt ballad". In it, the singer is "laying her emotions bare above the simplest, sweetest of piano melodies", her voice remaining the focus. The title track was described by critics as being quirky, and a collage of forgotten 1970s and 1980s club gems. "I'm a Ruin" is a mid-tempo composition in which Diamandis reflects on life and loving herself selfishly. The tense vocals are backed by lush, throwback synths and hard-hitting drums. A critic complimented the lyrics as similar to the ones she wrote for Electra Heart (2012), while also "starkly confessional".

"Better Than That" was described as "sassy" and "a future heavy-hitter, doused in wah-wah axes and classic funk and rock delvings" by The Line of Best Fit, while Diamandis herself said it was "like classic rock". "Savages", the penultimate track, reflects on humanity's proneness to violence, and is inspired by contemporary events including the Boston Marathon bombing and the Delhi gang rape; Diamandis called it one of the "most important" songs on Froot and expressed a wish for it to be released on its own, despite saying that it "doesn't scream radio single". The closing track, "Immortal", is a "delicate, stripped-back ballad that finds her contemplating the transitory nature of life", which Idolator viewed as a recurring theme in Diamandis's "occasionally morbid oeuvre", but added that she "always manages to examine the topic from an original perspective."

Release and promotion
The album's title track, "Froot", premiered on Diamandis's birthday, 10 October 2014, and was released digitally on 11 November 2014. The track listing was confirmed on 9 November 2014, while the album cover was unveiled the following day. Over the final 12 days before the album's release, each song (in the same order they appear on the track list) was released and promoted through a variety of outlets.

In an interview for Billboard in April 2015, Diamandis expressed a wish to repackage the album with new tracks to include "I'm Not Hungry Anymore". However, she later decided against it, stating that Froot works best as a 12-track album and that she was still not satisfied with the new track. However, a demo version of the song was leaked in 2017, and on 28 July 2019, Diamandis announced that she would be performing an acoustic version of "I'm Not Hungry Anymore" for the first time live during her Love + Fear Tour.

Froot of the Month
Diamandis had confirmed that six songs will be released before the album's release, one each month up until 6 April 2015, calling this strategy the "Froot of the Month". After questioning about the "Froot of the Month" strategy, Diamandis tweeted, "I came up with the 'Froot of the Month' strategy to enable me to release the music I wanted to, as opposed to what might work commercially." After the internet leak and subsequent early release of the album, fans speculated that this would be cut short to five songs, but despite this, the final song was released on its planned date.

"Froot" was the first of these releases in November, and was followed by "Happy" in December. The two were released as a limited-edition seven-inch vinyl single. "Immortal" was released in January and "I'm a Ruin" in February. They were also released as a limited-edition seven-inch vinyl single. "Forget" was released in March and "Gold" in April. They were released as the final limited-edition seven-inch vinyl single of the campaign. Following the conclusion of the "Froot of the Month" campaign, the remaining tracks on the album were released as limited-edition seven-inch singles. In addition, "Froot", "Happy", "I'm a Ruin" and "Forget" all received official releases as singles. In July 2015, "Blue" was released as the album's fifth official single, separate from the "Froot of the Month" campaign.

Neon Nature Tour

Diamandis gave several large profile performances during early 2015, such as a performance at the Governor's Ball in New York City between the 5 and 7 June. Other performances included Coachella Festival in April and the Lollapalooza Festival in August. After announcing a number of festival dates, in February Diamandis announced the first dates of her third headlining tour, the Neon Nature Tour. In an interview with The Guardian, Diamandis stated that her hopes for the merchandise stand for the Neon Nature Tour included scratch and sniff T-shirts, eye shadow and nail varnish modeled after Diamandis's colour palette, and glow-in-the-dark T-shirts so that audience members can wear them and be a part of the show. The stage decoration for the festival performances was described by Diamandis as an "electric garden, with luminous flowers and shiny fruit", though the debut of said setup during Lollapalooza Brasil wound up cancelled due to flight delays. The 48-date tour began in October 2015, and included performances in North and South America and Europe. On 5 April 2016, Diamandis concluded her tour and posted a picture to Instagram, along with a statement on Twitter.

Critical reception

Froot received positive reviews from contemporary music critics. At Metacritic, which assigns a normalised rating out of 100 to reviews from mainstream publications, the album received an average score of 75, based on 19 reviews. Martin Townsend of the Sunday Express described Diamandis as a "pop enigma", complimenting her sound "which comprises few of the usual R'n'B/pop clichés" and called the album "never less than enthralling", comparing it to "True Blue-era Madonna." Michael Cragg of The Observer described Froot as "a cohesive pop album that doesn't just rely on a couple of big singles", with particular praise focused on the deep introspection present throughout the record; he singled out "Better Than That" as "uncharacteristically bitter". Sarah Jamieson of DIY wrote that Froot "finds [Diamandis] at her most accomplished and intriguing", while saluting her as "untamed by genre, unbothered by coolness and unhindered by people-pleasing" and eventually hailed the album as "the jewel in her crown." Isabella Biedeharn of Entertainment Weekly noticed the shift in Diamandis's sound, saying that it complements her voice "which swings from voluptuous alto to fluttering soprano in one swoop" and described the album as "good fun, [...] with its smirking quips [...] and bubbling beats." Tony Clayton-Lea of The Irish Times applauded the diversity of the record's arrangements, noticing that they vary "from polite club bangers [...] to stripped-back ballads [...] to glorious pop", and stated that "what connects everything is Diamandis's assured creative bent, which remains original, singular and ridiculously poptastic." Matt Collar of AllMusic found that the album "combines everything that was uniquely tantalizing, and pugnaciously feminist, about her debut, while also retaining just enough of the enthusiastic pop hooks and dance beats of Electra Heart to keep things from getting too serious" and defined it as "an arch, swaggeringly impressive album that balances its pop sweetness with a deep-rooted maturity."

Laurence Day of The Line of Best Fit described Froot as "an anthology of astute nihilistic, existentialist discussions" and called it "one of the most complex pop albums of recent years." Rory Cashin of State felt that the album is "far more focused" than its predecessor, and described Diamandis as "that emotionally intelligent outsider who knew how to perfectly articulate those weird thoughts and reactions we all have but would never admit to". He concluded by stating that "with Froot, we've got to know Marina a little better, and through that, we know ourselves a little better, too." Lisa Wright of Digital Spy gave a moderate review and noticed a problem of identity in the album, saying that "there's much on Froot to love and even the tracks that dip into oft-chartered waters still have a playful spark that's hard to dislike, but three albums in, it's still difficult to see where Marina's collage of influence fits in pop's spectrum." Caroline Sullivan of The Guardian called Froot "a record of intense highs and lows", which includes "a range of styles that don't always join up well", however, she remarked that "if you allow yourself to be swept into [Diamandis'] world, it's an intriguing place." Marc Hirsh of The Boston Globe described Diamandis as "a curious specimen, seeming silly on the macro scale but revealing herself a more canny artist upon closer inspection—and then, when you look closer still, becoming silly again", and noted that some tracks "fall flat" and "mistake quirk for personality", but ultimately felt that "a few slices of FROOT are exactly ripe enough".

Idolator readers named Froot the "Best Album of Winter 2015",
and in the PopCrush Fan Choice Awards, readers named Froot the "Best Album of 2015" with 36% of the votes. Metacritic also identified Froot as being the ninth most discussed album of 2015 amongst its users. "I'm a Ruin" was nominated for the 2015 Popjustice £20 Music Prize.

Commercial performance
Froot debuted at number 10 on the UK Albums Chart, selling 10,411 copies in its first week. It sold 2,294 copies in its second week, falling to number 44. In the United States, the album entered the Billboard 200 at number eight with first-week sales of 46,000 units, 43,000 of which consisted of traditional album sales; it became Diamandis's first top-10 album on the chart. As of August 2015, the album had sold 75,000 copies in the United States. The album debuted at number six on the Canadian Albums Chart with 4,500 copies sold in its first week.

Froot was moderately successful across Europe, reaching number four in Ireland, number 10 in Switzerland, number 19 in Finland and number 24 in Germany. In Oceania, it peaked at number 12 in both Australia and New Zealand, becoming Diamandis's highest-charting album in both countries.

Track listing

Personnel
Credits adapted from the liner notes of Froot.

Musicians
 Marina Diamandis – keyboards, lead vocals, backing vocals
 David Kosten – keyboards, percussion, programming
 Jason Cooper – drums 
 Jeremy Pritchard – bass 
 James Ahwai – bass 
 Chris McGrath – bass 
 Fyfe Dangerfield – piano ; guitar 
 Keith Bayley – guitar 
 Alexander Robertshaw – guitar 
 Wez Clarke – additional programming

Technical
 David Kosten – production, engineering ; mixing 
 Marina Diamandis – production
 Mo Hausler – additional engineering
 Al Lawson – drum recording engineering assistance
 Drew Smith – drum recording engineering assistance
 Wez Clarke – mixing
 Lewis Hopkin – mastering

Artwork
 Charlotte Rutherford – photography
 Sam Coldy – artwork

Charts

Certifications

Froot Acoustic EP

Froot Acoustic EP is the sixth extended play by Welsh singer and songwriter Marina Diamandis, released under the stage name Marina and the Diamonds. It was self-released digitally on 8 June 2015 through her Myspace page, and contains three acoustic versions of songs that originally appeared on the eponymous album. The music videos of these versions were released between December 2014 and March 2015. Because Diamandis' Myspace is currently defunct, the acoustic songs are only available in YouTube.

Track listing

Release history

Notes

References

External links
 Froot on Diamandis' official website
 

2015 albums
Atlantic Records albums
Concept albums
Elektra Records albums
Marina Diamandis albums